Jafarabad (also Romanized as Ja‘farābād) is a village in Rostaq Rural District, in the Central District of Neyriz County, Fars Province, Iran. At the 2006 census, its population was 496, in 131 families.

References 

Populated places in Neyriz County